Dover Motor Speedway (formerly Dover Downs International Speedway and later Dover International Speedway) is a race track in Dover, Delaware. The track has hosted at least one NASCAR Cup Series race each year since 1969, including two per year from 1971 to 2020. In addition to NASCAR, the track also hosted USAC and the Indy Racing League. The track features one layout, a  concrete oval, with 24° banking in the turns and 9° banking on the straights. The speedway is owned and operated by Speedway Motorsports.

The track, nicknamed "The Monster Mile", was built in 1969 by Melvin Joseph of Melvin L. Joseph Construction Company, Inc., with an asphalt surface, but was replaced with concrete in 1995. Six years later in 2001, the track's capacity increased to 135,000 seats, giving the track the largest seating capacity of any sports venue in the mid-Atlantic region. In 2002, the name changed to Dover International Speedway from Dover Downs International Speedway after Dover Downs Gaming and Entertainment split, making Dover Motorsports. From 2007 to 2009, the speedway worked on an improvement project called "The Monster Makeover", which expanded facilities at the track and beautified the track. Depending on configuration, the track's capacity is at 95,500 seats. Its grand total maximum capacity was at 135,000 spectators. On November 8, 2021, it was announced that Dover Motorsports Inc. was purchased by Speedway Motorsports Inc.; effectively making Dover International Speedway a SMI track with the track being renamed to its current name.

Track history
In 1966, Melvin L. Joseph Construction Company, Inc. began construction on Dover Downs International Speedway, which was specialized for horse racing and auto racing. The race track was completed three years later, and would have its first race on July 6, 1969. The inaugural race, known as the Mason-Dixon 300, was won by Richard Petty.

During the 1971 racing season, the speedway removed all the events not sanctioned by NASCAR to help keep focus on the two NASCAR Winston Cup Series races, which were 500 miles each. Eleven years later, Dover Downs International Speedway added a NASCAR Budweiser Late Model Sportsman Series (now Xfinity Series) event, the Sportsman 200. In 1986, the speedway added 3,200 seats to its 10,333 seat grandstand. Dover Downs International Speedway continued adding seats each year until 2001. A second Xfinity Series race was also added to the speedway's schedule during the 1986 season.

Eight years later, Delaware General Assembly passed legislation to allow slot machines at pari-mutuel horse racing venues. In 1995, Dover Downs International Speedway replaced its asphalt surface with concrete, making it the second NASCAR Cup Series track after Bristol Motor Speedway to have a racing surface completely composed of concrete. During the same year, Dover Downs slots opened on December 29. Two years later, the speedway changed the race distances of its NASCAR Cup Series races to 400 miles, beginning with the 1997 fall race. In 1998, Dover Downs International Speedway added an Indy Racing League event to the schedule, but the race was removed after the 1999 season. During the 2000 racing season, Dover Downs International Speedway added a NASCAR Craftsman Truck Series event. Kurt Busch won the inaugural Truck race from the pole position.

On September 23, 2001, the Cup Series returned to racing at Dover after the September 11 attacks for the MBNA Cal Ripken Jr. 400, in which Dale Earnhardt Jr. received the checkered and American flag at the same time.

In the following year, the speedway's capacity was expanded to 135,000 seats, the largest of any mid-Atlantic sports venue. After the gaming side of Dover Downs separated, Dover Motorsports, Inc. was created to operate the speedway, which caused the speedway to become Dover International Speedway in 2002. Two years later, the speedway announced the completion of the Monster Bridge, which is a glass-enclosed structure that has 56 seats over the third turn, and its fall NASCAR Cup Series race became the second race in the newly formed, NASCAR Chase for the Championship.

On May 26, 2006, Dover International Speedway announced a multi-year capital improvement project called "The Monster Makeover", which would begin after the speedway's June NASCAR Cup Series race. During the first stage of the improvement project in 2007, the speedway built a new 12-suite skybox complex and a new 2,100 square feet addition to the media center in the infield. Other improvements included widened walkways behind three grandstands, renovated restrooms, more paved handicapped parking areas, expanded bus parking, as well as a sound system with improved audio quality for the grandstands.

In 2008, the second stage of the "Monster Makeover" took place. During the stage, the Monster Monument, a 46-feet tall fiberglass structure, was built in the new Victory Plaza, the FanZone area was expanded, and an emergency services building was built. One year later, the speedway continued the improvement project by replacing the front stretch pit wall to install a longer SAFER barrier wall that would make a wider and safer pit road, as well as an additional pit stall. On December 30, 2011, Dover International Speedway announced that they will replace the 18 inch wide seats in the grandstands with 22 inch wide ones, reducing the capacity from 140,000 to 113,000 over the next two years.

Shortly after the 2014 AAA 400, Dover International Speedway began removing 17,500 seats in turn 2 and the lower level of turn 3 as a result of declining attendance, reducing the track's capacity to 95,500. The removal of the seats was completed by Christmas 2014. Also after the 2014 AAA 400, the track began work on a $2.9 million project to install a new catchfence that was ready for the 2015 season. The track's capacity was reduced to 85,000 in 2016 by removing seats in the upper level of turn 3.

In 2019, Dover International Speedway built a new and expanded Cup Series garage, located between turns 1 and 2. The project also paved the inner portion of the track between turns 1 and 2 and replaced the guardrail in this area with a SAFER barrier. Work on this project, which cost $5.5 million, was planned to begin on May 6, 2019 and be completed by September 20, 2019, ahead of the race weekend in October 2019. After the 2019 season, Dover International Speedway will remove 29,000 seats in the lower level between turns 3 and 4, reducing the track's capacity to 54,000.

Since 2011, the track is the headquarters for the Monster Mash Marathon, a full and half marathon running event that starts at the entrance to pit road, making one lap around the track, exiting at the start-finish line crossover gate, with runners making a run through Dover before finishing at the track entrance gate in front of the Miles the Monster statue.  The race name references both its October date and the track's "Monster Mile" moniker. Also since 2012, the Firefly Music Festival has been held in The Woodlands of Dover International Speedway, a 105-acre (42 ha) festival ground adjacent to the speedway. Firefly additionally utilizes some of the speedway's infrastructure for parking and camping. In recent years, the speedway’s infield has been used specifically for RV camping throughout the festival.

Dover International Speedway moved one of its race weekends in 2021 to Nashville Superspeedway, another track owned by Dover Motorsports. On November 8, 2021, Speedway Motorsports acquired track owner Dover Motorsports. As a result, Speedway Motorsports took over ownership of the track and it was renamed to Dover Motor Speedway.

Miles the Monster
The speedway's mascot is called "Miles the Monster," which is a monster spawned from the track's nickname, "The Monster Mile." The monster is featured on the winner's trophy, the track's tickets, memorabilia, website, and the  Monster Monument. A previous nickname that the track had was "White Lightning," used in the initial years after the track surface changed from asphalt to concrete.

Races 

 NASCAR Cup Series – Würth 400
 NASCAR Xfinity Series – A-GAME 200
 ARCA Menards Series East – General Tire 125

Former races
 NASCAR Cup Series – Dover 400
 NASCAR Xfinity Series – Drydene 200
 NASCAR Gander RV & Outdoors Truck Series – KDI Office Technology 200

Track records

NASCAR

Lap Records
The fastest official race lap records at Dover Motor Speedway (formerly Dover Downs International Speedway/Dover International Speedway) are listed as:

NASCAR Cup Series statistics 

* from minimum 5 starts.

Race results

USAC Championship Car results

Indy Racing League results

References

External links

Dover Motor Speedway Official Site

Dover International Speedway Page  on NASCAR.com
High Resolution image from Google Maps

NASCAR tracks
Motorsport venues in Delaware
Buildings and structures in Dover, Delaware
IndyCar Series tracks
NASCAR races at Dover Motor Speedway
Tourist attractions in Dover, Delaware
1969 establishments in Delaware
Sports venues completed in 1969